The 1983 Arab Athletics Championships was the fourth edition of the international athletics competition between Arab countries. It took place in Amman, Jordan from 19–22 August. A total of 39 athletics events were contested, 23 for men and 16 for women. The men's 20 kilometres walk was dropped from the programme, having been initiated at the 1981 edition. Although the majority of the races were measured using fully automatic time systems, four track finals were only timed to the tenth of a second due to technical issues.

Medal summary

Men

Women

Medal table

Overall

Men

Women

References

Results
 Al Batal Al Arabi (N°:12). Arab Athletics Union. Retrieved on 2015-02-14.

Arab Athletics Championships
Arab Athletics Championships, 1983
Sports competitions in Amman
Arab Athletics Championships
Arab Athletics Championships
Arab Athletics Championships, 1983
Arab Athletics Championships